Link light rail is a light rail rapid transit system serving the Seattle metropolitan area in the U.S. state of Washington.

The Link light rail system was originally conceived in the 1980s following several earlier proposals for a heavy rail system that were rejected by voters. Sound Transit was created in 1993 and placed a ballot measure to fund and build the system, which was passed on a second attempt in 1996. Tacoma Link began construction first in 2000 and opened on August 22, 2003, at a cost of $80 million. Central Link construction was delayed because of funding issues and routing disputes, but began in November 2003 and was completed on July 18, 2009, for $2.4 billion. Central Link trains initially ran from Downtown Seattle to Tukwila International Boulevard station before being extended south to the airport in December 2009, north to the University of Washington in March 2016, and further south to Angle Lake station in September 2016. An extension to Northgate station opened on October 2, 2021.

An extension from the University of Washington to Northgate opened on October 2, 2021. Suburban extensions to Bellevue, Redmond, Lynnwood, and Federal Way are scheduled to open between 2024 and 2025. Later projects will expand the system to cover the metropolitan area from Everett to Tacoma, along with branches to Kirkland, Issaquah, and the Seattle neighborhoods of Ballard and West Seattle.

History

The first public transit networks in the Puget Sound region were various streetcar, cable cars, and interurbans constructed in the late 19th and early 20th centuries, which spurred the development of streetcar suburbs. Some of these systems were consolidated into the Seattle Municipal Street Railway, a city-owned network established in 1918, while others remained under the operation of their private owners. Unsuccessful proposals for a rapid transit system to connect Seattle's neighborhoods, and later other cities in the region, also emerged during the peak and later decline of streetcar and interurban service, both of which were dismantled by 1941.

Following the 1968 and 1970 rejection of the Forward Thrust ballot measure to build a rapid transit system, voters in King County approved the creation of a new countywide bus system under the management of Municipality of Metropolitan Seattle, an existing water treatment and sewage agency. The system began operating in 1973 and later included the construction of the Downtown Seattle Transit Tunnel in the late 1980s to relieve bus congestion on downtown streets. Metro and the Puget Sound Council of Governments also began planning a regional transit system at that time; a joint 1981 study named light rail as the preferred mode that would be able to operate on streets in some areas but generally follow freeway corridors to regional centers. A non-binding advisory ballot measure on further development of a light rail system approved by voters in 1988. Metro's transit tunnel opened for buses in September 1990 and included tracks and electrical systems that would be compatible for future conversion to light rail.

In 1993, the state legislature formed a new agency, the Central Puget Sound Regional Transit Authority (now Sound Transit), to oversee development of an inter-county transit system that would include light rail, commuter rail, and express buses in King, Pierce, and Snohomish counties. A ballot measure to fund a $6.7 billion plan (equivalent to $ in  dollars) with a  light rail network, which would connect Seattle to Lynnwood, Bellevue, and Tacoma, was rejected by 53 percent of voters on March 14, 1995. The new package, estimated to cost $3.9 billion (equivalent to $ in  dollars) with funding from a sales tax and motor vehicle excise tax, was approved by voters on November 5, 1996. In August 1997, Sound Transit adopted "Link" as the name for the light rail system along with Sounder for commuter rail and Regional Express for buses.

The Downtown Tacoma line, named Tacoma Link, was preceded by a shuttle bus from the new Tacoma Dome multimodal station built by Pierce Transit in 1997. The project was anticipated to revitalize the city's downtown and serve the new University of Washington Tacoma campus. The line's  route—primarily on Commerce Street and Pacific Avenue—was approved in 1999 and construction officially began on October 18, 2000. Tacoma Link opened on August 22, 2003, with five stations, and cost $80.4 million (equivalent to $ in  dollars) to construct. The line had no fares and exceeded its 2010 ridership projections by early 2003, carrying its 500,000th passenger in April of the year.

During the late 1990s and early 2000s, debates raged over various issues surrounding the Central Link line, which would connect Sea-Tac to Seattle. In the late nineties and early 2000s, Sound Transit underwent a series of financial and political difficulties. The cost of the line rose significantly, and the federal government threatened to withhold necessary grants. In 2001, Sound Transit was forced to shorten the line from the original proposal, and growing enthusiasm for the proposed monorail brought rising opposition to the light rail from Seattle-area residents.

On November 8, 2003, a groundbreaking ceremony was held for the Central Link light rail line. Central Link opened between Westlake Station and Tukwila on July 18, 2009, at a cost of $2.4 billion (equivalent to $ in  dollars). It was extended  to SeaTac/Airport on December 19, 2009.

A grant was approved in November 2008, which allowed University Link to begin construction in December 2008. The line opened, including the University Link Tunnel, on March 19, 2016.

In September 2019, Sound Transit renamed Central Link to the Red Line and Tacoma Link to the Orange Line as part of their update to transit branding. Two months later, the agency announced that it would consider a new name for the Red Line after complaints because of the similarity of the "Red Line" with redlining as well as confusion over King County Metro's RapidRide system (which utilizes red bullets for its service routes). A new naming scheme came into effect in 2021, using the "1 Line" (green) for the existing line in Seattle, the "2 Line" (blue) for East Link, and the "T Line" (orange) for Tacoma Link. Future light rail extensions will use the "3 Line" (magenta) and the "4 Line" (purple), alongside new names for Sounder and bus rapid transit services.

Lines

1 Line (Northgate–Angle Lake)

The 1 Line, formerly Central Link, is a light rail line serving 19 stations in Seattle, SeaTac, and Tukwila, using trains of three to four cars that each have a normal capacity of 194 passengers with up to 74 seats. It connects Northgate, the University of Washington, and Downtown Seattle to the Rainier Valley and Seattle–Tacoma International Airport, using tunnels, elevated guideways, and surface-running sections. Trains run every 8 minutes during peak periods and 10–15 minutes at other times with trips from 4:00 a.m. to 1:30 a.m. on weekdays and Saturdays, and from 5:00 a.m. to 12:30 a.m. on Sundays. In 2019, the 1 Line carried over 25 million passengers and averaged nearly 80,000 on weekdays, making it the busiest transit route in the Seattle region.

The initial  segment of Central Link was opened on July 18, 2009, between Westlake and Tukwila International Boulevard stations. The northernmost four stations, in the Downtown Seattle Transit Tunnel, were shared with buses until they were rerouted in 2019. The line was extended six months after opening to SeaTac/Airport station, a  project that began construction in 2006 due to delays in planning. A northern extension to the University of Washington campus with two stations in a  tunnel opened on March 19, 2016. A one-stop extension to Angle Lake station to the south opened in September of that year.

T Line (Tacoma Dome–Commerce Street)

The T Line, formerly Tacoma Link, is a streetcar line that connects Downtown Tacoma and nearby neighborhoods to Tacoma Dome Station, a regional hub for buses and Sounder commuter rail. It runs primarily in traffic lanes, sharing the Commerce Street transit mall with buses, and uses a mix of single and double-tracked sections. Service began on August 26, 2003, and was expanded with the opening of an infill station at Commerce Street/South 11th Street in 2011.

Trains on the line typically run every 12 minutes on weekdays and Saturdays and every 24 minutes on Sundays and holidays. The T Line has service from 5:00 a.m. to 10:00 p.m. on weekdays and reduced hours on other days, but operating hours are extended for major evening events at the Tacoma Dome. In 2019, the line carried approximately 935,000 passengers and averaged 3,100 riders on weekdays. Patronage peaked in 2012 at over 1 million passengers, but has declined since then.

Stations

, the Link light rail system has 25 stations—nineteen on the 1 Line and six on the T Line. The two lines use different types of station designs but share several features, including weather canopies, signage, information kiosks, ticket vending machines, seating, electronic information displays, bicycle parking, and public artwork. The system also uses proof-of-payment for fare validation with paid fare zones in lieu of faregates. To comply with the Americans with Disabilities Act of 1990 (ADA), all Link stations include accessible seating, signage with Braille lettering, pathways, level boarding, and tactile paving on the edge of platforms.

The majority of the 1 Line's stations are at-grade, especially in the Rainier Valley and SODO, with a mix of elevated and underground stations in other areas. Some stations also feature parking lots, public restrooms, retail spaces, and designated busking areas.

Infrastructure

1 Line trains are operated and maintained by King County Metro, who also run paratransit service along the corridor. The Central Operations and Maintenance Facility (OMF) in SODO is used to store, maintain, and clean trains during off-peak and overnight hours. It opened in 2007 and has a capacity of 105 light rail vehicles, including nine bays inside the  maintenance building that can hold 16 vehicles. An additional maintenance facility in Bellevue is planned to open with the 2 Line with a capacity of 96 vehicles. T Line trains are directly operated by Sound Transit and maintained at a facility in Tacoma.

Rolling stock

, the Link light rail system uses a total of 102 low-floor light rail vehicles—99 for the 1 Line and 3 for the T Line. Both models are able to run in four-car consists but do not have cross-compatibility. All Link vehicles allow for level boarding and feature accessible seating areas that can be folded up for wheelchair users. A form of positive train control is used to prevent trains from exceeding the set speed limit for a given area. By 2025, the Link fleet will have 214 total vehicles for use on the 1 Line and 2 Line as well as five for the T Line.

The Series 1 fleet of 62 cars, manufactured in Osaka and assembled in Everett, was divided into three orders beginning with a contract signed in 2003. The first vehicle was delivered in November 2006 for the Central Link project and was followed by deliveries for the SeaTac/Airport and University Link extensions that concluded in 2011; each unit was valued at $4.2 million in 2014. Each car has 74 seats and a capacity of 194 passengers during normal loads, with a maximum "crush load" of 252 people; the layout is 70 percent low floor with raised sections at each end that are accessed via stairs. Railcars include four doors on each side, a wheelchair area, and two bicycle hooks above luggage storage areas.

The Series 2 fleet, retroactively designated the Siemens S700, was commissioned in 2016 as part of a $642 million order to support the ST2 expansion program. The vehicles were manufactured in Sacramento, California, and are the same length and width as the Series 1 fleet, but feature a wider aisle in the articulated section, improved passenger information displays, and larger windows. The first vehicle was delivered in June 2019 and entered service in May 2021; the final car in the full 152-car order is planned to be delivered by 2024.

In 2022, Sound Transit began planning specifications for a Series 3 that would have approximately 100 vehicles. It is expected to begin delivery in 2029 and be complete in 2032 for the first batch of ST3 projects.

The T Line fleet consists of three low-floor articulated Škoda 10 T streetcars that were manufactured in the Czech Republic by Škoda Transportation. Each vehicle has 30 seats and can carry an additional 85 standing passengers at crush loads. The Škoda fleet will be supplemented in 2023 by a set of five Brookville Liberty streetcars, which were ordered in 2017. The Brookville Liberty streetcars each have 26 seats and can carry a total of 100 passengers; they were delivered in 2022.

Electricity

Trains are supplied electricity through an overhead catenary that is energized at 1,500 volts direct current for the 1 Line and 700 volts for the T Line. The current is converted to three-phase alternating current through on-board inverters.

Since December 2020, the Link light rail system has been running fully on carbon emissions-free renewable energy through Puget Sound Energy's wind electricity purchase program and Seattle City Light's fully carbon-neutral power supply.

Future expansion

The future system is anticipated to serve 750,000 daily passengers at full build-out and cost up to $131 billion. The expansions are primarily funded through local taxes passed by voters in a pair of multimodal transit ballot measures. The Sound Transit 2 (ST2) package, passed in 2008, funded several extensions to be finished by 2025, including three that opened between 2016 and 2021. Sound Transit 3 (ST3) was approved in 2016 and funded new extensions of Link that will open between 2024 and 2046, including projects in Pierce and Snohomish counties. Several deferred or truncated projects from ST2 were also funded and accelerated by the ST3 plan.

Since 2016, the original timelines for both expansion packages have been modified due to the COVID-19 pandemic, labor shortages, and construction issues. Sound Transit adopted a "realignment plan" in 2021 that delayed most projects by two to five years, primarily to address a $6.5 billion shortfall in projected revenue that would be needed to avoid reaching a state-imposed debt limit by 2029. The cost estimate for the largest project in the ST3 package, the West Seattle/Ballard Link Extension, increased by 50 percent between 2019 and 2021, reaching $12 billion due to higher property values and lower revenue amid the pandemic. A set of new delays, mainly affecting Sound Transit 2 projects, was announced in 2022 following a four-month regional strike by concrete truck drivers, as well as unexpected conditions discovered during work.

All five lines are planned to connect at various hubs and interline in some areas to increase frequency in high-demand corridors. Upon completion of several planned extensions in the 2020s and 2030s, the 1 Line would run from Tacoma Dome Station to Downtown Seattle, where it would use a new tunnel, and continue northwest to Ballard. The 2 Line and 3 Line would interline from the existing Downtown Seattle Transit Tunnel on the existing 1 Line corridor to Snohomish County, sharing tracks as far north as Mariner in southern Everett. The 3 Line would continue south to West Seattle and north to Downtown Everett, while the 2 Line serves Bellevue and Redmond. The 4 Line, connecting Kirkland to Issaquah, would interline with the 2 Line in Downtown Bellevue. In addition to the new lines, three infill stations in Seattle are planned to be built by 2031 at Boeing Access Road, Graham, and Northeast 130th Street.

2 Line (Mariner–Redmond)

The 2 Line is planned to be the third Link light rail line, connecting Seattle to the Eastside suburbs of Mercer Island, Bellevue, and Redmond. Construction began in 2016 and the $3.7 billion line was planned to open in two phases: in 2024 from International District/Chinatown station in Seattle to Redmond Technology station in Overlake; and in 2025 from Overlake to Downtown Redmond station with one intermediate stop. , plans to open a shorter starter line between Bellevue and Redmond by 2024 or the whole line in 2025 are under consideration. The 2 Line would continue north to Lynnwood and southern Everett by sharing tracks with the 1 Line (and later the 3 Line). The western half of the line is being built in the median of Interstate 90, including a section on a floating bridge that would be first railway of its kind in the world.

3 Line (Everett–West Seattle)

The 3 Line is planned to open in 2032 with the completion of the West Seattle Link Extension, which would connect West Seattle to an interim terminus at SODO station. The line would be extended north to replace the 1 Line following the completion of the Ballard Link Extension in 2037, which would include a new  tunnel in Downtown Seattle for trains arriving from the Rainier Valley. The final terminus of the 3 Line is planned to be Everett Station, a multimodal hub in Downtown Everett, upon completion of the Everett Link Extension in 2037 or 2041 depending on funding.

4 Line (South Kirkland–Issaquah)

The 4 Line, the fifth Link light rail line, is scheduled to open in 2041 or 2044 depending on funding availability and would only serve the Eastside. The line is planned to run from the South Kirkland park-and-ride towards Downtown Bellevue, where it would interline with the 2 Line, and continue along Interstate 90 to Issaquah. It is planned to include four new stations and total  in length; an earlier proposal for the line continued on the Cross Kirkland Corridor to a terminus in Downtown Kirkland but was not included in the ST3 plan due to opposition from local residents.

Future segments

Some figures and dates are provisional due to quality control, geological risk, and labor issues that have caused delays in some projects.

Land-use impacts

An expressed purpose in building the Link light rail system has been to support a "smart growth" approach to handling the region's population growth and development. By concentrating new development along light rail lines (a practice known as "transit-oriented development"), more people can live more densely without the increases in automotive commuting traffic that might otherwise be expected. In addition, the concentration of residents near stations helps maintain ridership and revenue. Climate change activists also point out that compact development around light rail lines has been shown to result in reductions in residents'  emissions, compared to more conventional suburban automotive commutes.

Environmentalists, transportation groups and some affordable housing advocates have sought greater government regulatory support for transit-oriented development along Link light rail, and in 2009 a bill was introduced in the Washington State Legislature that would have raised allowable densities (as well as lowering parking requirements and easing some other regulations on development) in station areas. As part of Sound Transit 3 in 2016, the Washington State Legislature mandated that Sound Transit reserve at least 80% of the surplus land surrounding light rail stations for affordable housing developments.

See also
 List of Link light rail stations
 Sounder commuter rail
 Seattle Streetcar
 List of rail transit systems in the United States

References

External links

 Sound Transit website
 System expansion

 
 
Light rail in Washington (state)
Transportation in Seattle
Railway services introduced in 2003
2003 establishments in Washington (state)